The Slane Castle Formation is a geologic formation in Ireland. It preserves fossils dating back to the Carboniferous period.

See also

 List of fossiliferous stratigraphic units in Ireland

References
 

Carboniferous System of Europe
Carboniferous Ireland
Carboniferous southern paleotropical deposits